Vaqasluy-e Olya (also Romanized as Vaqāşlūy-e ‘Olyā; also known as Kachal‘alī-ye ‘Olyā and Vaqāşlū-ye ‘Olyā) is a village in Nazlu-e Shomali Rural District, Nazlu District, Urmia County, West Azerbaijan Province, Iran. At the 2006 census, its population was 670, in 173 families.

References 

Populated places in Urmia County